Cameron Irwin McIntosh (July 1, 1926 – September 24, 1988) was the 15th Lieutenant Governor of Saskatchewan from 1978 to 1983.

Born in North Battleford, Saskatchewan, the son of Cameron Ross McIntosh, McIntosh was educated at the University of Saskatchewan.

Honorific eponyms
Awards
  Saskatchewan: C. Irwin McIntosh Journalism Prize
  Saskatchewan: Cameron McIntosh Memorial Cup

References

1926 births
1988 deaths
Canadian Presbyterians
Lieutenant Governors of Saskatchewan
People from North Battleford